Richard Simpson may refer to:

 Richard Simpson (martyr) (c. 1553–1588), English Catholic priest, martyred during the reign of Elizabeth I
 Richard Simpson (writer) (1820–1876), Catholic writer and literary scholar
 Richard F. Simpson (1798–1882), U.S. Representative from South Carolina
 Richard M. Simpson (1900–1960), U.S. Representative from Pennsylvania
 Richard Simpson (Scottish politician) (born 1942), Scottish politician
 Dick Simpson (born 1943), American baseball outfielder
 Dick Simpson (politician) (born 1940), former Chicago alderman
 Chubb Rock (Richard Simpson, born 1968), New York-based rapper
 Richard Simpson (rugby union), rugby union player who represented Australia
 Richard J. Simpson, professor of biochemistry
 Richard James Simpson (born 1967), American singer and guitarist
 Rick Simpson, American set director
 Rik Simpson, British record producer, musician and songwriter